Vasile Deheleanu (12 August 1910 in Austria-Hungary (now Romania) – 30 April 2003) was a Romanian footballer who played in midfield and coach.

Biography 

At club level, he played in Liga I for Politehnica Timişoara, România Cluj, UD Reșița and Ripensia Timişoara.

With the Romania national football team, he was picked by joint coaches Josef Uridil and Costel Rădulescu to take part in the 1934 World Cup in Italy. The team were eliminated in the first round, when they lost 2–1 to Czechoslovakia.

Death 

At the date of his death, he was the only survivor of the Romania national football team squads which participated at the first three FIFA World Cup editions.

Honours

Player
Ripensia Timișoara
Liga I (4): 1932–33, 1934–35, 1935–36, 1937–38
Cupa României (2): 1933–34, 1935–36

External links
 
 

1910 births
2003 deaths
Sportspeople from Timișoara
People from the Kingdom of Hungary
Romania international footballers
Romanian footballers
Liga I players
Victoria Cluj players
FC Politehnica Timișoara players
FC Ripensia Timișoara players
CSM Reșița players
1934 FIFA World Cup players
Romanian football managers
FC Politehnica Timișoara managers
Association football midfielders